NGC 479 (also known as UGC 893, MCG 1-4-31, ZWG 411.31, PGC 4905) is a spiral galaxy in the constellation Pisces. It was discovered by German astronomer Albert Marth on October 27, 1864. It is about 240 million light-years away from Earth.

References

External links 
 

Barred spiral galaxies
Pisces (constellation)
0479
+1-4-31
004905
Astronomical objects discovered in 1864
Galaxies discovered in 1864
00893